Faye Wong (born Xia Lin on 8 August 1969) is a Hong Kong singer-songwriter. Early in her career she briefly used the stage name Shirley Wong. Born in Beijing, she moved to Hong Kong in 1987 and her debut album Shirley Wong (1989) came to public attention in the early 1990s by singing in Cantonese, often combining alternative music with mainstream Chinese pop. Since 1994, she has recorded mostly in her native Mandarin. In 2000, she was recognised by Guinness World Records as the "Best Selling Canto-Pop Female". Following her second marriage in 2005, she withdrew from the limelight, but returned to the stage in 2010.

Hugely popular in Hong Kong, Taiwan, China and Singapore, she has also gained a large following in Japan. In the West she is perhaps best known for starring in Wong Kar-wai's films Chungking Express (1994) and 2046 (2004). While she has collaborated with international artists such as Cocteau Twins, Wong recorded only a few songs in English, including "Eyes on Me" (1999) —the theme song of the video game Final Fantasy VIII (1999). Wong is known to be a "diva with few words" in public, and has gained a reputation for her "cool" personality. In Encyclopedia of Contemporary Chinese Culture, Jeroen de Kloet characterised her as "singer, actress, mother, celebrity, royalty, sex symbol and diva all at the same time". Wong is considered by some as one of East Asia's biggest popstars with a career of over 30 years.

Life and career

1969–1987: Early life and career beginnings 
The daughter of a mining engineer and a revolutionary music soprano, Wong was born at Peking Union Medical College Hospital in Dongcheng District, Beijing  in the midst of China's Cultural Revolution. She has an elder brother named Wang Yi (王弋). As a student, Wong already was involved in singing and attracted interest from several publishers . On occasions, the school had to hide her artistic activities from her strict mother, who as a professional saw singing as a dead-end career. Despite her mother's opposition, Wong released 6 low-cost cover albums from 1985 to 1987 while still in high school, all in the form of cassettes, mostly consisting of songs by her personal idol, iconic Taiwanese singer Teresa Teng. For the last of these early recordings, the producer Wei Yuanqiang chose the title Wong Fei Collection, intending to show that he recognised a distinctive talent in the teenager.

In 1987, after being accepted to Xiamen University for college, she migrated to Hong Kong to join her father, who had been working there for a few years. The plan was for her to stay there for a year to fulfill the permanent residency requirement, and go to a university abroad thereafter. However, since Wong did not know a word of Cantonese, the language spoken in the British colony, she experienced great loneliness. Following a brief modeling stint, she began singing lessons with Tai See-Chung (戴思聰), who was also from Mainland China and had previously tutored Hong Kong superstars Anita Mui, Andy Lau, Leon Lai and Aaron Kwok. Under Tai's tutelage, the 19-year-old signed with Cinepoly Records after winning third place in an ABU singing contest in 1988. It was a risky move on the part of Chan Siu-Bo, Cinepoly's general manager, since Mainlanders were stereotyped as "backwards" in Hong Kong.

As a result, Cinepoly asked Wong to change her "Mainland-sounding" name to a "sophisticated" stage name Wong Jing Man. (Her English name was to be "Shirley".)

1989–1991: Shirley Wong, Everything, You're the Only One, and Coming Home 
In 1989, her debut album Shirley Wong sold over 30,000 copies  and helped her win bronze at the "Chik Chak New Artist Award".  Two more albums (Everything and You're the Only One) followed, similarly featuring many cover songs by artists from the US and Japan. However, they sold worse than her debut album, despite relentless promotions by the company. Many in Hong Kong perceived her to be "backwards", lacking personality.

Frustrated with her career decision, in 1991 she travelled to New York City for vocal studies and cultural exchange. Because it was a hurried decision, she also ended up missing the registration deadline for her classes in New York. Faye Wong explained in 1996,

Wong returned to Hong Kong and found a new agent in Katie Chan, who would remain her agent for the next two decades. The next album, Coming Home, would prominently feature on the cover the English name "Faye", a homophone to her given Chinese name, and the word "Jing", a reference to her hometown Beijing.

1992–1995: Coming Home, Regrets, 100,000 Whys, Random Thoughts, Mystery, Sky, Decadent Sounds of Faye and Di-Dar 
The 1992 album Coming Home incorporated R&B influences and was a change in musical direction from the more traditional Cantopop fare of her earlier albums. One song by her of this time was "Fragile Woman", a cover of a Japanese song "Rouge" originally composed by Miyuki Nakajima and sung by Naomi Chiaki. (Thanks to Wong's cover, this 1972 song—in different language versions—would in the early 1990s become a huge regional hit in Thailand, Vietnam and the rest of Southeast Asia and even Turkey; the most popular English version was titled "Broken-Hearted Woman".) Coming Home also included her first English-language number, "Kisses in the Wind". Wong stated in a 1994 concert that she very much liked this song, after which various websites listed it as her personal favourite; however, in a 1998 CNN interview she declined to name one favourite song, saying that there were too many, and in 2003 she stated that she no longer liked her old songs.

The cover for Coming Home prominently shows the name "Faye", and from then on she changed her stage name back to "Wang Fei". In 1992–93 she also starred in TVB shows such as File of Justice II and Legendary Ranger. On February 1993, she wrote the Mandarin lyrics for her ballad "No Regrets" (執迷不悔) which led many to praise her as a gifted lyricist. In February, it became the title track to her album No Regrets. No Regrets features soft contemporary numbers, a few dance tracks and two versions of the title ballad: Wong's Mandarin version, and a Cantonese version (lyrics by Chen Shao Qi). On September 1993, her next album 100,000 Whys showed considerable alternative music influences from the West, including the popular song "Cold War" (冷戰), a cover of "Silent All These Years" by Tori Amos.

Faye has named the Scottish post-punk group Cocteau Twins among her favourite bands, and their influence was clear on her next Cantonese album, Random Thoughts. Her Cantonese version of The Cranberries' "Dreams" was featured in Wong Kar-wai's film Chungking Express, and gained lasting popularity. Besides covering songs and learning distinctive vocal techniques, Wong recorded her own compositions "Pledge" (誓言), co-written with ex-husband Dou Wei, and her first and only spoken-word song "Exit" (出路), which expresses some of her pessimism about the future. Besides two Cantonese albums in 1994, Wong released two other albums in Mandarin in Taiwan, Mystery and Sky. The runaway hit "I'm Willing" (我願意) in Mystery became her trademark hit in the Mandarin-speaking communities for years, and has been covered by other singers such as Gigi Leung, Sammi Cheng and Jay Chou. Sky was seen by fans as a successful amalgam of artistic experimentation and commercialism. While her hits in Hong Kong were noticeably alternative, her two Mandarin albums were more lyrical and traditional. Critics generally credit Taiwanese producer Yang Ming-huang for their success. Four best-selling albums in Cantonese and Mandarin, a record-breaking 18 consecutive concerts in Hong Kong, and a widely acclaimed film (Chungking Express) made Faye Wong the most eminent female Hong Kong singer in the mid-1990s. Meanwhile, her distaste for the profit-oriented HK entertainment industry became more and more apparent. She was frequently in touch with the rock circle in Beijing. Given her somewhat reticent and nonchalant personality, she would sometimes give terse, direct, and somewhat unexpected answers when asked personal questions by the HK media.

In 1995, she released Decadent Sounds of Faye, a cover album of songs originally recorded by her idol Teresa Teng, one of the most revered Chinese singers of the 20th century. A duet with Teng was planned for the album, but unfortunately she died before this could be recorded. Decadent Sounds sold well despite initial negative criticism, and has come to be recognised as an example of imaginative covering by recent critics.

Faye Wong along with her then yet-to-be husband and rock music icon Dou Wei, were the winner and the runner-up to the 1995 MTV International Viewer's Choice Award; claiming first and second-place respectively with the music videos "Chess" and "Black Dream". In December, she released her Cantonese album Di-Dar which mixes an alternative yodelling style with a touch of Indian and Middle Eastern flavour. This album was a success, partly because it was so different from the mainstream Cantopop music, but—ironically—a couple of very traditional romantic songs topped the charts.

1996: Fuzao and Cinepoly EPs 
1996 saw the release of what many would consider her boldest and most artistically coherent effort to date, Fuzao, usually translated as Restless or Impatience. This was her last album with Cinepoly, and Wong felt she could take more artistic risks. The album contains mainly her own compositions, with an aesthetic inspired by the Cocteau Twins, who penned two original songs for the album, "Fracture" (分裂) and "Repressing Happiness" (掃興). As Wong had covered their work in 1994, she had established a remote working relationship with them—even laying down vocals for a special duet version of "Serpentskirt" on the Asian release of the group's 1996 album, Milk And Kisses.

Although the album was Wong's personal favourite, the response from Hong Kong and Taiwan was less supportive. Many fans who enjoyed her previous three Mandarin albums turned their back on Restless, which they considered to be too alternative and self-absorbed. There were few ballads which were radio-friendly and some became disenchanted with Faye's experimental style of recording. However, hardcore fans, known as Fayenatics, adored the album and it became a cult hit. Wong has not released another fully artistic album since. After the release, Wong became the second Chinese artist (after Gong Li)—and the first Chinese singer—to be featured on the cover of Time magazine.

From 1993 to 1995, Cinepoly released an EP of Wong's songs each year: Like Wind (如風), Faye Disc (菲碟), and One Person, Two Roles. Then in 1996–97, she recorded ten original songs in Cantonese all written by lyricist Lin Xi and various composers, such as Wong Ka Keung, Adrian Chan, and Chan Xiao Xia, before her departure from Cinepoly. After her contract with Cinepoly expired, the company released eight of these songs in the two subsequent EPs entitled Toy (玩具) and Help Yourself (自便). Although the EPs contained new songs—ballad hits like "Undercurrent" (暗湧), "Date" (約定), and "On Time" (守時)—and were welcomed by fans, they received lukewarm critical responses. The other two songs were included in later compilations; the last to be released was "Scary" (心驚膽顫) in 2002.

1997-1998: Faye Wong and Sing and Play 
Wong signed for the recording giant EMI in 1997 after her first daughter was born, in a contract worth HK$60 million (approx. US$7.7 million), to release 55 songs in five albums. While most of her earlier albums were sung in Standard Cantonese, Wong has since sung almost exclusively in Mandarin, her mother tongue, although she recorded Cantonese versions of a couple of songs in each of her last four albums with EMI to please her Hong Kong audience. Having gone through a period of experimentation, Wong stated that she wished to make "music that I like. I do not care if others don't, though I would be delighted if they do".

Her first album with EMI was Faye Wong (王菲 1997), released in autumn 1997. Critics expecting another artistic breakthrough after 1996's Restlessness found—much to their dismay—a much more inoffensive and commercially oriented musical album. Simon Raymonde and Robin Guthrie of the Cocteau Twins wrote two original compositions for the album, but only one, "The Amusement Park" (娛樂場), was used. This release included an acoustic cover of the Cocteau Twins' "Rilkean Heart", renamed "Nostalgia" (懷念).

This album is filled with feelings of lethargy, languor and disengagement, yet most of the tracks sound warm and sweet, as opposed to those piquant self-centered ones before her motherhood. Reporters noticed that she began to smile more often in public and was not as icy or aloof as before. However, the album was released during the Asian financial crisis which swept East and Southeast Asia. Wong's old company Cinepoly, which retains the copyright on her previous records, released a Mandarin compilation at the same time in 1997 to counteract her new EMI album (and indeed outperformed it). Later, Cinepoly would release two compilations each year to compete with Faye's new releases, a tactic which has come under fire from her international fans. Faye Wong did not sell well in Hong Kong, but did quite well in Taiwan and mainland China. Although Wong had garnered some popularity with her 4 previous Mandarin albums, it was really this sweet yet slightly alternative album which had the Mainland Chinese audience listening. Her profile began to rise sharply in Asia.

In 1997 singer Na Ying signed with EMI and struck a lasting friendship with Wong. Na had been a regular at the annual CCTV New Year's Gala, the highest-watched TV show in Mainland China, and she invited Wong to do a duet with her on the upcoming show in 1998. The collaboration by the "Mainland Diva" and "Hong Kong Diva", titled "Let's Meet in 1998", became an instant hit and arguably the most played song in Mainland China that year. Thanks to this exposure, in late 1998 Wong finally held her first concert in her native Mainland China, and continued her tour in 9 cities.

Sing and Play was released in October, and contained four songs composed by Faye: the opening track "Emotional Life", "Face", "A Little Clever" and "Tong" (both written for her daughter, the latter produced by Dou Wei). Amongst other songs were "Give Up Halfway" (sung both in Mandarin and Cantonese), which was one of the more commercially successful tracks from the album, along with the successful ballad "Red Bean" (紅豆).

It was the best selling Chinese album in Singapore in 1999. Together with Lovers & Strangers and the compilation album Wishing We Last Forever, it gave Faye Wong 3 albums in the Singapore top 10 selling Chinese albums of 1999, making her one of the best selling artists in Singapore in 1999.

In Japan, the album sold close to 90,000 copies in the first three months after its release.

1999: "Eyes on Me" and Lovers & Strangers 
The video game Final Fantasy VIII was released in Japan in February 1999, for which Faye Wong recorded the ballad "Eyes on Me" in English. It was the first time that a Japanese video game featured a Chinese singer for its theme. The "Eyes on Me" single sold over 335,620 copies in Japan and 500,000 worldwide, making it the best-selling video game music disc to that date, and winning "Song of the Year (Western Music)" at the 14th Annual Japan Gold Disc Awards. When the game was released in North America later that year, the theme song became very popular among gamers in the West; while it was not a mainstream hit there (as Wong had no desire to explore these markets), she gained many fans who were not previously familiar with her music.

In March, she held two concerts in Nippon Budokan, with tickets for the first show on 11 March being sold out in one day and an extra show added on 12 March; she was the first Chinese singer to perform in that venue. Earlier in the year, Pepsi-Cola had made Wong a spokesperson, and after these concerts she shot the promotional music video for "Spectacular" (精彩), which Pepsi used in commercials.

The album Lovers & Strangers was released in late September, and sold over 800,000 copies, topping the charts in Hong Kong, Mainland China, Taiwan, Singapore and Malaysia. This was her first album after she parted from her husband Dou Wei, and her first without any musical collaborations with him since their relationship began. The title track was featured in Sylvester Stallone's remake of Get Carter. Wong also became a spokesperson for JPhone in October, performing in several commercials which aired in Japan.

In addition, she began filming for 2046 in August, a project she would pursue on and off over the next few years when her schedule permitted.

2000–2004: Fable, Faye Wong and To Love 

The new millennium saw a shift in Wong's musical career with the album Fable. The prominent feature of this album is its segregated and distinguishable halves—songs in the first half of the album running in an almost continuous manner and in a format that is akin to a song-cycle, and the second half of discrete, chart-friendly numbers. The album itself derives its artistic merits from the first half, notable for its unique thematic and continuous sequencing of songs unprecedented in the Chinese music industry. The theme itself is ambiguous and the lyrics subject to multiple interpretations, though it is quite certain that the theme of Fable forms the main thematic reference, derived from the motivic elements of the prince and princess in fables and fairytales of European origins. Elements of spirituality, metaphysics and Buddhism hold an important place in the lyrics as well, penned by Lin Xi who has by then, been unanimously identified as Faye's lyricist par excellence. Musically the arrangements display influences of drum and bass, electronica, east-west collage and lush string orchestral infusions. Her other activities during this year included the Pepsi promotional duet and music video of "Galaxy Unlimited" with Aaron Kwok, the filming of Okinawa Rendezvous, as well as several concerts in China and Taiwan.

By this time, Faye had forged a famous alliance with producer/musician Zhang Yadong and lyricist Lin Xi, often referred to by the HK public as the 'iron triangle'. However, due to Zhang Yadong's unavailability during this period (he was engaged on other projects), Faye decided to treat this last album with EMI as an experiment whereby she would collaborate with new producers/musicians/lyricists and 'see what their vision of her will be'.

Nevertheless, the response from the public and critics alike were lukewarm at best. Faye herself admitted that she was not totally satisfied with some tracks, namely those produced by Taiwan 'father of rock' Wu Bai, which had an industrial electronica flavour reminiscent of Karen Mok's 'Golden Flower' album. She cited the two folk-style songs written by Singaporean singer-songwriter Tanya Chua as her favourite picks on her album. The song that generated most noise from the press turned out to be "Vertigo" (迷魂記), a ballad penned by former love Nicholas Tse. Faye Wong (王菲 2001) reached number 14 on the Japan Oricon charts.

While she was under contract with EMI and later Sony, she performed in the ensemble movie 2046 which had been in production since 1999 and finally wrapped in 2004. She performed at fund-raising concerts to benefit various charities, including ones that helped those who suffered from AIDS and SARS. She sang on tracks with other celebrities such as Tony Leung, Anita Mui, and Aaron Kwok. She also starred in a Japanese TV serial, Usokoi, and the film Leaving Me Loving You with Leon Lai.

The theme song for Usokoi, titled "Separate Ways", was released as a single; it was one of her few Japanese songs (another being "Valentine's Radio"). She recorded several other solo non-album tracks, such as the eponymous hit theme song to Hero and a Buddhist song containing similar sounds to some of her work on her album Fu Zao. In addition, she recorded a recitation of the Heart Sutra. Meanwhile, her former record companies released several more compilations and boxed sets of her records.

For her Sony album To Love, released in November 2003, she recorded 13 tracks, 10 in Mandarin and 3 in Cantonese. She wrote the music and lyrics for 3 songs, the title track "To Love", "Leave Nothing" (不留), "Sunshine Dearest" (陽寶), as well as the music for "April Snow" (四月雪). Before the album's release, her Cantonese song "The Name of Love" (假愛之名), with lyrics by Lin Xi, was banned in some areas such as mainland China because the lyrics mentioned opium. According to interviews, she said that she preferred the Mandarin version of the song (the title track); she had penned these lyrics herself, and they made no reference to drugs. She also recorded "Passenger" (乘客), a cover of Sophie Zelmani's "Going Home". The album became more successful than her previous self-titled album, both financially and critically. Afterwards, she held numerous successful concerts for over a year.

Faye Wong was awarded pan-Asian female artist of the year at the sixth CCTV-MTV Music Honors. At the 2004 Golden Melody Awards, she was awarded Best Female Artist after being nominated many times. Her acceptance speech, in which she quipped "I've known that I can sing, therefore I will also confirm this panel's decision", was controversial to the local Taiwanese media.

2005–2009: Hiatus 
In January 2005, during the last concert of her tour, the usually reticent Faye Wong left a quote that left her fans wondering: "If I ever retire from showbiz, I hope you all forget about me." In May 2005 her agent Katie Chan (陳家瑛) confirmed to press that Wong was "resting indefinitely". Two months later she wed actor Li Yapeng, and their daughter was born in the following year.

In the four years that followed, Faye Wong would not return, ignoring Live Nation's offer of 100m-HKD, and even rejecting the 3m-yuan offer for a once-in-a-lifetime opportunity to sing at the Beijing Olympics opening ceremony on her birthday—the Beijing native was the unanimous choice of netizens, receiving over 63% of the tens of millions of votes cast in a CCTV online poll. The honour eventually went to Liu Huan.) She did, however, voluntarily perform for causes she truly cared about: she sang "Wishing We Last Forever" in May 2008 at a CCTV fundraising event for Sichuan earthquake victims, and "Heart Sutra" in May 2009 for a Buddhist ceremony at the Famen Temple.

In May 2009, Wong appeared in an ad for "Royal Wind" shampoo, sparking speculation that it would be the first step in her comeback.

In June 2009, a compilation of 3 CDs and 1 DVD was released by Universal Music and sold very well in the public.

2010 to 2012: Comeback Tour 

In recent years, Faye Wong completed an extensive concert tour, but is otherwise relatively inactive in the music industry. She has not announced any intention to produce further studio albums, although she has made occasional releases of a few singles. She does not attend music awards, nor was she involved in the promotion of her comeback concert tour, which was held in many different cities across Asia from October 2010 to June 2012. Her main concerns are Buddhism, charity and her own family.

Her return was clearly marked in February 2010, when she performed at the CCTV New Year's Gala watched by over 700 million people, covering Li Jian's ballad "Legend". Later in July 2010, she first announced a series of comeback concerts starting from 29 October 2010 onwards, namely 5 in Beijing and another 5 in Shanghai. To satisfy huge overseas market demand, she declared to have more concerts in other cities of Mainland China, Taipei in Taiwan, Hong Kong, Malaysia and also Singapore. The tour began in October 2010 and concluded in June 2012.

Despite her lengthy absence, interest was overwhelming: in mainland China tickets worth nearly 200 million yuan (US$29 million) were taken up in just 10 days while in Taiwan the computerised ticketing system crashed due to excessive traffic, and 90 percent of the tickets were sold within two hours after it was restored. The story repeated itself in Hong Kong, with 93% of the tickets gone in one morning and 2 ticketing phone lines added to the existing 3, to cope with the huge demand.

2016: Faye's Moments Live 
"Faye’s Moments Live 2016” (幻樂一場) was a concert which was held in Shanghai’s 8,000-seat Mercedes-Benz Cultural Centre on 30 December 2016. The concert was notable in that fans were able to watch a free live webcast via the Tencent Video website.

Personal life 
In the early 1990s, Wong began a relationship with Dou Wei, a Beijing rocker of the band "Black Panther" who was much more famous in Mainland China. In June 1996, the couple married. Their daughter, Dou Jingtong (meaning "child of Dou and Jing" [from Wong's given name Jingwen]) was born on 3 January 1997. The baby's voice appears in the song "Tong" on the 1998 album Sing and Play, as well as the title track of the album Lovers & Strangers released in 1999. They divorced in late 1999 with Wong claiming the rights to the daughter and waiving child support.

Wong began dating Mainland television actor Li Yapeng in 2004 in Beijing; their wedding took place in July 2005. Around the time of her wedding, her manager confirmed that she might take an indefinite break from the entertainment business.  In January 2011, appearing for the first time with her husband on a talk show, Wong told host Yang Lan that the past 5 years of her married life has been "very steady, very satisfying". On 13 September 2013, Wong and Li announced that they had divorced.

In 2014, rumours surfaced that Wong was back together with Nicholas Tse, whom she had dated in a high-profile relationship in 2000. The duo were photographed in Wong's apartment in Beijing in September 2014. They were seen doing housework, watching television and kissing.

Faye Wong is a vegetarian. In 2008, Wong was voted "Asia's sexiest vegetarian woman" in the poll conducted among members of PETA (People for the Ethical Treatment of Animals) and was again nominated for the award in 2010.

Charities and Smile Angel Foundation 

In August 2006, Li Yapeng published a thousand-word public online letter, "Gratitude (感謝)", on his Sina.com blog. The letter served as an outlet for their gratitude towards all concerned parties, and confirmed rumours their daughter was born with a congenital cleft lip. He expressed their reason for seeking medical treatment in California: due to the severity of Li Yan's cleft, the special reconstructive surgeries she needed were not available in China. Citing a South American folk tale, Li described his daughter as a special child and her cleft as a mark of an angel. The couple has since established the Smile Angel Foundation to assist children with clefts.

On 26 December 2006 Wong made her first public appearance since 2005 at the foundation's inaugural fundraising ball. She opted not to speak or sing, but her new composition "Cheerful Angel" (愛笑的天使) debuted at the event as the official theme song of the charity. At the second fundraising ball on 8 December 2007, Wong mentioned that although she would not return to her music career in 2008, she would consider it afterwards. However, she sang and produced an electronica-infused version of the Diamond Sutra for the event. For the foundation's publicity event on 27–28 November 2008, Wong and her husband visited children in Tibet who are in various stages of recovery after being cured with the help of the charity. To date, the foundation has raised over 35 million renminbi, including over 29.5 million from auctions during the three December fundraisers, and helped more than 2008 children.

In May 2008, following the disastrous earthquake in Sichuan, the couple accepted a local girl who lost a leg trying to save her classmates, to their family as she underwent recuperation and treatments in Beijing. The middle school student returned to her hometown a year later but help would not stop; the Lis agreed to continue paying for her medical needs until she turns 22 and visit her at least once a year. In March 2012, the Smile Angel Foundation donated 15 million Japanese yen to ChildFund Japan to help needy children after the 2011 Tōhoku earthquake and tsunami.

In 2012, Smile Angel Foundation established China's first charity paediatric hospital. The Beijing-based hospital is expected to offer free surgery to 600 children with cleft lips each year and will start operations in June.

In April 2010, the China Social Sciences Press recognised Wong as one of the 13 "richest souls" in China. In May 2013, Wong and Li topped the inaugural "China Celebrity Philanthropist List" compiled by the China Philanthropist magazine, which used a methodology designed to measure a celebrity's positive influence on charitable donations.

On 19 May 2013, Faye sang four songs in a memorial concert celebrating Teresa Teng's 60th birthday, with a portion of the concert proceeds going to the charity. The concert is notable in that Wong's first song in the concert, Li Bai's "清平調", is a duet with Teng planned 18 years prior, using vocals from Teng released posthumously for the first time.

Microblog 
In 2010, Sina Weibo users discovered Wong's microblog under the account "veggieg", and unveiled a Faye Wong who is open, talkative and surprisingly funny with her use of cyberlanguage and puns. As of April 2014, the account had over 23 million followers, but it has not been active since early 2015.

Artistry and legacy

Concerts 

The focus of Faye Wong's concerts has always been on her vocal performance. She seldom dances or speaks to the audience, and there are generally no supporting dancers. There were two exceptions to the latter in the 1994–95 live concerts; first, many dancers joined Faye on stage for the lively song "Flow Not Fly". In the second half, Faye and a line of male dancers were menaced by a giant mechanical spider overhead during the song "Tempt Me".

Another trademark is her unconventional fashion on stage. Her 1994 concerts were memorable for dreadlocks and extremely long sleeves, as well as for the silver-painted tears. She later said "I wore long sleeves because usually I don't have choreography; I don't know what to do with my hands." Her 1998 concerts saw her sporting the "burnt" cheek makeup, the "Indian chief" look, and the soleless strap-on boots. At the start of her 2003 concerts her headgear was topped by an inverted shoe supporting a very long feather, and her makeup for that concert went through several changes of painted eye-shades.

Her 2003 concerts set a Hong Kong record, selling 30,000 tickets within three days.

She does not perform encores, and usually exits by sinking below the stage via a platform. After her release of Miyuki Nakajima's "Mortal World" (人間) in 1997, she ended her concerts for the next few years with this song while shaking hands with the audience, then taking a deep bow to a horizontal position before leaving the stage. However, during her recent Comeback Tour from 2010 to 2012, she ended with "Flower of Paradise" (彼岸花), a song from the album Fable (2000).

She has given concerts in North America and Australia as well as many venues in East and Southeast Asia, including charity concerts.  The key features of her four major concert tours are set out below.

Public image 
Dutch scholar Jeroen Groenewegen credits Wong's mass appeal to some of her perceived "cool" traits including autonomy, unique artistry and childishness. The part of Faye Wong's personality that resonated most with her audiences is her independence and her courage to be different. As she wrote for the lyrics of "No Regrets",

Katie Chan, Wong's agent, once said "Faye does whatever she wants. ... it's really quite a miracle that she became a success."

In addition, Faye Wong is seen and thus idolised by many as a woman willing to sacrifice for love. In 1994, on one of the many trips to Beijing to see Dou Wei, Hong Kong paparazzi from Next Magazine followed her and tracked her down. The photographs taken, showing her entering an unhygienic community toilet in a narrow hutong to dump urine—in sharp contrast to the modern and glamorous lives Hong Kong celebrities led—caused quite a stir, with some in Cinepoly fearing that her diva image would be tarnished. But many were impressed. As Taiwanese lyricist Chien Yao, who initially declined to write lyrics for Wong because he never met and knew very little about her, recalled in 2012,

Legacy 
In 2004 and 2005, Faye Wong was ranked in the top five on the Forbes China Celebrity 100, as well as in 2011 and 2012 after her hiatus. In a 2011 "most popular celebrity in China" marketing study, she was also ranked in the top 5. In 2008, Wong was voted Asia's sexiest vegetarian woman in a poll run by animal rights group PETA. In 2009, to celebrate the 60th anniversary of the People's Republic of China, a government web portal conducted an online poll on The Most Influential Chinese Cultural Celebrity in the Past 60 Years; out of 192 candidates, Wong received over 7 million votes, second only to the deceased Teresa Teng from Taiwan, Wong's own personal idol. In 2014, she was named one of the 10 most admired female singers in Asia by RHA media. Chen Tao, a China Radio International DJ, compares Wong's influence in the Sinophone world to Madonna's in America: "She represents a certain era of pop music, a certain trend, and a vision of being unique."

In the 2010s, fans have started Faye Wong-themed small businesses in Beijing and Wuhan. Wong probably also has more Western fans than most of her C-pop peers, collectively referred to as "Fayenatics". Songs or albums specifically paying tribute to her include:
 "(I Want to See) Faye Wong" (and an alternate version titled "More Faye") by American punk rock band J Church
 "Faye Wong" by Norwegian band Green Club Riviera
 "Wong Fei, gwanyu nei dik mei" (王菲，關於你的眉; Faye Wong, about your eyebrows) by Hong Kong band my little airport
 "Wang Fei de huimou" (王菲的回眸; Faye Wong's back glance) by Chinese band YuFeiMen
 I Love Faye Wong (我愛王菲), debut album of Taiwanese singer Maggie Chiang
"We are not romantic in this age" (在這個年代我們不浪漫) by Taiwanese band Easy Weeds (溫室雜草).

Wong's songs have been covered in other languages, for example "Liuxing" (流星) was covered in Japanese by Hanayo, "Xiangnaier" (香奈兒) in Korean by Lim Hyung-joo, and "Hongdou" (紅豆) in Vietnamese by many different artists. Lene Marlin's "Still Here" is an English cover of "Wo yuanyi" (我願意).

The female protagonist in the 2013 Chinese film Beijing Flickers was prototyped after Wong, according to director Zhang Yuan. Zhang remembered when he shot his 1993 hit Beijing Bastards with Dou Wei, Wong as Dou's girlfriend would visit the set every day. Japanese director Shunji Iwai had explained that the titular pop-star character of his 2001 film All About Lily Chou-Chou was conceived after attending a Faye Wong concert. Wong's name was also mentioned in the 2003 Japanese film The Blue Light as one of the protagonist's favourites.

China's 2007 spacecraft Chang'e 1 played Faye Wong's version of "Wishing We Last Forever".

Discography

Cantonese-language studio albums 
 Shirley Wong (1989)
 Everything (1990)
 You're the Only One (1990)
 Coming Home (1992)
 No Regrets (1993)
 100,000 Whys (1993)
 Random Thoughts (1994)
 Please Myself (1994)
 Di-Dar (1995)
 Be Perfunctory (2015)

Mandarin-language studio albums 
 Mystery (1994)
 Sky (1994)
 Decadent Sounds of Faye (1995)
 Fuzao (1996)
 Faye Wong (1997)
 Sing and Play (1998)
 Lovers & Strangers (1999)
 Fable (2000)
 Faye Wong (2001)
 To Love (2003)

Tours

Setlists 

The following setlists only include songs published in the concert albums, not all songs performed throughout the tours.

 夢遊
 夢中人
 多得他
 無奈那天
 靜夜的單簧管
 Medley:
 Miss You Night & Day
 Summer of Love
 又繼續等
 Everything
 不再兒嬉
 從明日開始
 明天我要嫁給你
 Medley:
 天與地
 用心良苦
 Medley:
 如風
 季候風
 有一天我會
 浪漫風暴
 Kisses in the Wind
 流非飛
 愛與痛的邊緣
 知己知彼
 胡思亂想
 誓言
 誘惑我
 棋子
 執迷不悔
 容易受傷的女人
 冷戰
 千言萬語
 出路
 我願意

 Overture
 感情生活
 浮躁
 悶
 暗湧
 天空 (unplugged)
 臉
 迷路
 夢中人
 夢遊
 原諒自己
 末日
 墮落
 天使
 懷念
 夢醒了
 但願人長久
 情誡
 一人分飾兩角
 為非作歹
 Di-Dar
 曖昧
 Bohemian Rhapsody
 你快樂 (所以我快樂)
 Auld Lang Syne
 約定
 償還
 我願意
 執迷不悔

 Overture
 我願意
 再見螢火蟲
 悶
 矜持
 Medley:
 半途而廄
 只愛陌生人
 開到茶靡
 過眼雲煙
 流浪的紅舞鞋
 新房客
 香奈兒
 感情生活
 掙脫
 推翻 (unplugged)
 你 (unplugged)
 但願人長久
 天空
 Separate Ways
 天使
 Eyes on Me
 Thank You For Hearing Me
 人間

 Overture
 天空
 誓言
 Medley:
 純情
 背影
 夢中人
 流浪的紅舞鞋
 我願意
 假如我是真的
 只願為你守著約
 但願人長久
 新房客
 香奈兒
 將愛
 開到荼蘼
 償還
 紅豆
 暗湧
 光之翼
 悶
 Heart of Glass
 旋木
 只愛陌生人
 The Look of Love
 如風
 愛與痛的邊緣
 精彩
 Medley:
 尾班車
 靜夜的單簧管
 守時
 約定
 給自己的情書
 冷戰
 人間

 N/A (Not yet officially released)

Filmography

Films

Television

Awards and achievements 
 
|-
! colspan=3 style="background: #DAA520;" | Top Chinese Music Chart Awards

! colspan=3 style="background: #DAA520;" | Golden Melody Awards

Footnotes

References

External links 

   (While unverified, the account is believed to belong to her)
 
 王菲 – photo montage (may be slow to load)
 Faye Wong Today – feifan's fan site
 菲迷府 – Fayenaticshome 
 All About Ah Faye – Stefan's fan site
 
 唱遊王菲天與地 – Cecilia's Fan Site 
 Smile Angel Foundation 
  

 
1969 births
20th-century Hong Kong actresses
21st-century Chinese actresses
20th-century Hong Kong women singers
21st-century Chinese women singers
Actresses from Beijing
Cantopop singers
Chinese emigrants to British Hong Kong
Chinese film actresses
Chinese Mandopop singers
Chinese mezzo-sopranos
EMI Records artists
English-language singers from Hong Kong
Hong Kong film actresses
Hong Kong Mandopop singers
Hong Kong mezzo-sopranos
Hong Kong women singer-songwriters
Living people
Mandopop singer-songwriters
People's Republic of China Buddhists
Singers from Beijing
Video game musicians
Women in electronic music